Gilbert de Stirling was an early 13th-century bishop of Scotland. His background is unclear, perhaps coming from a burgess family of Stirling; he emerges in 1228 as the newly elected Bishop of Aberdeen, succeeding the recently deceased Adam de Kalder, after Matthew the Scot had turned down his own election in order to become Bishop of Dunkeld.

Most of the knowledge historians have about Bishop Gilbert's episcopate relates to various legal agreements made with other religious institutions, including confirmations of grants made to St Andrews Cathedral Priory and the Céli Dé of Monymusk, the latter made by Donnchadh, Earl of Mar. He also settled a dispute with the Bishop of Moray regarding certain rights in boundary churches.

He died at Aberdeen in 1239.

References
 Dowden, John, The Bishops of Scotland, ed. J. Maitland Thomson, (Glasgow, 1912), p. 103
 Innes, Cosmo, Registrum Episcopatus Aberdonensis: Ecclesie Cathedralis Aberdonensis Regesta Que Extant in Unum Collecta, Vol. 1, (Edinburgh, 1845), p. xxii-iii
 Keith, Robert, An Historical Catalogue of the Scottish Bishops: Down to the Year 1688, (London, 1924), pp. 106–7
 Watt, D.E.R., Fasti Ecclesiae Scotinanae Medii Aevi ad annum 1638, 2nd Draft, (St Andrews, 1969), p. 1

1239 deaths
Bishops of Aberdeen
People from Stirling
13th-century Scottish Roman Catholic bishops
Year of birth unknown